The Ministry of Commerce, Trade, Tourism and Transport (MCTTT) is a ministry of Fiji responsible for formulating and implementing policies and strategies to facilitate growth and investments in Fiji and promoting trade, tourism, and consumer protection.

Divisions 

 Economic Unit – responsible in formulating and monitoring policies and projects in the private sector.
 Trade Unit – formulate and implement policies to coordinate international trade and investments.
 Tourism Unit – responsible in developing the tourism industry.
 Finance Unit – provides financial aid to the Ministry and its statutory agencies.
 Human Resources Unit – provides administrative support in managing departments, agencies and trade commissions.
 MSME Fiji – formulate policies for the development of micro, small and medium enterprises (MSME).
 Department of Cooperative Business – implement policies to promote the establishment and monitoring of businesses.
 Department of National Trade Measurement Standards – implement laws and regulations to protect consumers from unsafe and poor quality products.
 Department of Transport – efficiently manage transport planning and monitor policies that affiliate with transport.

References 

Government of Fiji
Government ministries of Fiji